Ali Asqar Peyvandi born 1962- Sorkheh, is an Iranian physician, politician and university professor. He was the head of the Iranian Red Crescent Society between 2017 and 2019 when he was forced to resign before being arrested on charges of embezzlement.

Education 
Peyvandi received his general medical degree from Shiraz University of Medical Science in 1989 and also Otorhinolaryngology degree from the same university in 1993. He also took an additional surgery course in 2001 at University of Graz.

Arrest 
He was arrested on embezzlement charges on 2 November 2019 and  released in few hours on a 30 billion IRR collateral. On 4 December 2019, he was arrested for the second time after he resigned from his position as the head of the Iranian Red Crescent Society.

References 

Islamic Association of Physicians of Iran politicians
Iranian surgeons
Otolaryngologists
People from Semnan, Iran
People from Sorkheh, Semnan, Iran
Living people
1962 births